Walter Rich (died 1446/7) of Bath, Somerset, was an English politician.

He was a Member (MP) of the Parliament of England for Bath in April 1414, 1417, December 1421, 1422, 1425 and 1435. He was Mayor of Bath c. September 1416 – 1417, ?1418–19, 1424–25, ?1430–31, July 1438 – c. September 1439, and October 1442 – 1443.

References

14th-century births
1440s deaths
English MPs April 1414
Mayors of Bath, Somerset
English MPs 1417
English MPs December 1421
English MPs 1422
English MPs 1425
English MPs 1435